Neivamyrmex is a genus of army ants in the subfamily Dorylinae.

Range 
Neivamyrmex species can be found from the central United States to southern Argentina.

Taxonomy 
As of 2021, 129 Neivamyrmex species have been identified. However, most research pertaining to this genus is based on a single species, Neivamyrmex nigriscens, from which knowledge about Neivamyrmex overall is derived. Many species are known based only on a small number of male individuals.

Biology 

Neivamyrmex do not build permanent nests; instead, colonies are nomadic, establishing temporary bivouacs every night before moving on to a new location. Most species are predominantly subterranean, but they will occasionally forage above ground at night or on cloudy days. The larvae and pupae of other ant species are the principle food of Neivamyrmex, including ants of the genera Veromessor, Pheidole, Solenopsis, and Formica.

Male Neivamyrmex possess wings, while queens are flightless. Fertilization of queens may occur purely within the colony, with mating occurring between brothers and sisters, or unrelated males may fly in from foreign colonies to reproduce. After being fertilized, new queens will found new colonies by leaving their natal colonies alongside a large number of workers.

Species

Neivamyrmex adnepos (Wheeler, 1922)
Neivamyrmex agilis Borgmeier, 1953
Neivamyrmex albacorpus Varela Hernández & Castaño-Meneses, 2011
Neivamyrmex alfaroi (Emery, 1890)
Neivamyrmex andrei (Emery, 1901)
Neivamyrmex angulimandibulatus Watkins, 1974
Neivamyrmex angustinodis (Emery, 1888)
Neivamyrmex antillanus (Forel, 1897)
Neivamyrmex asper Borgmeier, 1955
Neivamyrmex balzani (Emery, 1894)
Neivamyrmex baylori Watkins, 1973
Neivamyrmex bohlsi (Emery, 1896)
Neivamyrmex bruchi (Forel, 1912)
Neivamyrmex californicus (Mayr, 1870)
Neivamyrmex carettei (Forel, 1913)
Neivamyrmex carinifrons Borgmeier, 1953
Neivamyrmex carolinensis (Emery, 1894)
Neivamyrmex chamelensis Watkins, 1986
Neivamyrmex clavifemur Borgmeier, 1953
Neivamyrmex cloosae (Forel, 1912)
Neivamyrmex compressinodis Borgmeier, 1953
Neivamyrmex cornutus Watkins, 1975
Neivamyrmex crassiscapus Watkins, 1990
Neivamyrmex cratensis Borgmeier, 1953
Neivamyrmex cristatus (André, 1889)
Neivamyrmex curvinotus Watkins, 1994
Neivamyrmex densepunctatus (Borgmeier, 1933)
Neivamyrmex detectus Borgmeier, 1953
Neivamyrmex diabolus (Forel, 1912)
Neivamyrmex diana (Forel, 1912)
Neivamyrmex digitistipus Watkins, 1975
Neivamyrmex diversinodis (Borgmeier, 1933)
Neivamyrmex dorbignii (Shuckard, 1840)
†Neivamyrmex ectopus Wilson, 1985
Neivamyrmex emersoni (Wheeler, 1921)
Neivamyrmex emeryi (Santschi, 1921)
Neivamyrmex enzmanni Özdikmen, 2010
Neivamyrmex erichsonii (Westwood, 1842)
Neivamyrmex falcifer (Emery, 1900)
Neivamyrmex foveolatus Borgmeier, 1953
Neivamyrmex fumosus (Forel, 1913)
Neivamyrmex fuscipennis (Smith, 1942)
Neivamyrmex genalis Borgmeier, 1953
Neivamyrmex gibbatus Borgmeier, 1953
Neivamyrmex goeldii (Forel, 1901)
Neivamyrmex graciellae (Mann, 1926)
Neivamyrmex gracilis Borgmeier, 1955
Neivamyrmex gradualis Borgmeier, 1953
Neivamyrmex guerinii (Shuckard, 1840)
Neivamyrmex guyanensis (Santschi, 1916)
Neivamyrmex halidaii (Shuckard, 1840)
Neivamyrmex harrisii (Haldeman, 1852)
Neivamyrmex hetschkoi (Mayr, 1886)
Neivamyrmex hopei (Shuckard, 1840)
Neivamyrmex humilis (Borgmeier, 1939)
Neivamyrmex iheringi (Forel, 1908)
Neivamyrmex imbellis (Emery, 1900)
Neivamyrmex impudens (Mann, 1922)
Neivamyrmex inca (Santschi, 1921)
Neivamyrmex inflatus Borgmeier, 1958
Neivamyrmex iridescens Borgmeier, 1950
Neivamyrmex jerrmanni (Forel, 1901)
Neivamyrmex kiowapache Snelling & Snelling, 2007
Neivamyrmex klugii (Shuckard, 1840)
Neivamyrmex kuertii (Enzmann, 1952)
Neivamyrmex laevigatus (Borgmeier, 1948)
Neivamyrmex latiscapus (Emery, 1901)
Neivamyrmex legionis (Smith, 1855)
Neivamyrmex leonardi (Wheeler, 1915)
Neivamyrmex leptognathus (Emery, 1900)
Neivamyrmex lieselae (Forel, 1913)
Neivamyrmex longiscapus Borgmeier, 1953
Neivamyrmex macrodentatus (Menozzi, 1931)
Neivamyrmex mandibularis (Smith, 1942)
Neivamyrmex manni (Wheeler, 1914)
Neivamyrmex maroccanus (Santschi, 1926)
Neivamyrmex maxillosus (Emery, 1900)
Neivamyrmex megathrix Kempf, 1961
Neivamyrmex melanocephalus (Emery, 1895)
Neivamyrmex melshaemeri (Haldeman, 1852)
Neivamyrmex micans Borgmeier, 1953
Neivamyrmex microps Borgmeier, 1955
Neivamyrmex minensis (Borgmeier, 1928)
Neivamyrmex minor (Cresson, 1872)
Neivamyrmex modestus (Borgmeier, 1933)
Neivamyrmex mojave (Smith, 1943)
Neivamyrmex moseri Watkins, 1969
Neivamyrmex ndeh Snelling & Snelling, 2007
Neivamyrmex nigrescens (Cresson, 1872)
Neivamyrmex nordenskioldii (Holmgren, 1908)
Neivamyrmex nyensis Watkins, 1977
Neivamyrmex opacithorax (Emery, 1894)
Neivamyrmex orthonotus (Borgmeier, 1933)
Neivamyrmex pacificus Borgmeier, 1955
Neivamyrmex pauxillus (Wheeler, 1903)
Neivamyrmex perplexus Borgmeier, 1953
Neivamyrmex pertii (Shuckard, 1840)
Neivamyrmex physognathus (Emery, 1900)
Neivamyrmex pilosus (Smith, 1858)
Neivamyrmex piraticus Borgmeier, 1953
Neivamyrmex planidens Borgmeier, 1953
Neivamyrmex planidorsus (Emery, 1906)
Neivamyrmex postangustatus (Borgmeier, 1934)
Neivamyrmex postcarinatus Borgmeier, 1953
Neivamyrmex pseudops (Forel, 1909)
Neivamyrmex puerulus Borgmeier, 1955
Neivamyrmex pulchellus Borgmeier, 1955
Neivamyrmex pullus Borgmeier, 1953
Neivamyrmex punctaticeps (Emery, 1894)
Neivamyrmex quadratoocciputus Watkins, 1975
Neivamyrmex radoszkowskii (Emery, 1900)
Neivamyrmex raptor (Forel, 1911)
Neivamyrmex romandii (Shuckard, 1840)
Neivamyrmex rosenbergi (Forel, 1911)
Neivamyrmex rugulosus Borgmeier, 1953
Neivamyrmex scutellaris Borgmeier, 1953
Neivamyrmex shuckardi (Emery, 1900)
Neivamyrmex spatulatus (Borgmeier, 1939)
Neivamyrmex spoliator (Forel, 1899)
Neivamyrmex sulcatus (Mayr, 1868)
Neivamyrmex sumichrasti (Norton, 1868)
Neivamyrmex swainsonii (Shuckard, 1840)
Neivamyrmex tenuis Borgmeier, 1953
Neivamyrmex texanus Watkins, 1972
Neivamyrmex tristis (Forel, 1901)
Neivamyrmex vicinus Borgmeier, 1953
Neivamyrmex walkerii (Westwood, 1842)
Neivamyrmex wilsoni Snelling & Snelling, 2007

References

External links

Neivamyrmex page on AntWiki
Genus: Neivamyrmex page on AntWeb

Dorylinae
Ant genera